Douglas Turnbull Hamilton (born August 19, 1958) is a Canadian Olympic medallist rower.

Hamilton was born in 1958 in Toronto, Ontario, Canada. He won a bronze medal in the men's quadruple sculls event at the 1984 Summer Olympics. He won a gold medal at the 1985 World Rowing Championships in men's quadruple sculls, and bronze medals in the same event at the 1986 World Rowing Championships and 1987 World Rowing Championships He also competed at the 1988 Summer Olympics.

Doug married Lynn Polson (member of Team Canada women's basketball at the 1984 Summer Olympics, placing 4th), and they are parents to NHL hockey players Dougie and Freddie Hamilton.

Hamilton attended high school at University of Toronto Schools, and university at Queen's University and the London School of Economics where he obtained LLB and LLM degrees. He worked as a lawyer in Toronto for 30 years. During his legal career Hamilton volunteered in many capacities in Canadian amateur sport, including as VP of High-Performance of Rowing Canada Aviron, Chair of the Canadian Sport Centre Ontario, and Board Member of the Toronto 2015 Pan/Parapan Am Games. Hamilton now lives in St. Catharines, Ontario and is the Chair of the Niagara 2022 Canada Summer Games.

References

1958 births
Living people
Olympic bronze medalists for Canada
Olympic medalists in rowing
Olympic rowers of Canada
Rowers from St. Catharines
Rowers from Toronto
Rowers at the 1984 Summer Olympics
Rowers at the 1988 Summer Olympics
Canadian male rowers
Medalists at the 1984 Summer Olympics
World Rowing Championships medalists for Canada
20th-century Canadian people